Race Around the World was an Australian travel documentary and competition series produced by the Australian Broadcasting Corporation in 1997 and 1998. The series was brought to the ABC by filmmaker Michael Rubbo, and was based on the Canadian television series Course destination monde (1988–1999).

Both seasons were hosted by Richard Fidler, a former member of the Doug Anthony All Stars comedy group.

Premise
For each series, eight "racers" were selected from video auditions from the Australian general public. The only stipulation for the video auditions was a lead in of ten seconds of black. John Safran submitted his audition with ten seconds of yellow. The successful applicants undertook a brief course in documentary film-making, before deciding on an itinerary for their journey around the world. They were then given a digital video camera, and sent to their first destination.

Over the next 100 days, the racers were required to devise, arrange and film a series of ten four-minute documentary films, as well as a stand-by documentary and five "postcards". This gave them ten days to travel to their next destination, film the video, and send it back to the ABC in Sydney with detailed editing instructions.

The series was broadcast as a weekly half-hour program, with four films shown per episode. Each film was then judged by a panel of three media and film experts including David Caesar, Sarah Macdonald, Tony Squires and Sigrid Thornton, as well as being put to a popular viewer vote. Points were deducted for late submissions.

Racers

First series (1997)

 Ben Davies from Sydney
 Bentley Dean from Sydney
 Scott Herford from Sydney
 Daniel Marsden from Brisbane
 Olivia Rousset from Perth
 Claudia Rowe from Melbourne
 John Safran from Melbourne
 Kim Traill from Melbourne, Victoria

Olivia Rousset was the winner of the first series.

Second series (1998)

 Cate Anderson from Kangaroo Valley, New South Wales
 Rachel Bannikoff from Canberra
 Tim Bryson from Adelaide
 Sheona McKenna from Melbourne
 David Shankey from Brisbane
 John Thiris from Sydney
 Catherine Turner from Sydney
 Tony Wilson from Melbourne

Tony Wilson was the winner of the second series.

After the Race
Although receiving fairly high ratings for its timeslot, Race Around the World was a considerable logistical and financial drain on the publicly funded ABC. In 2000, the series, now entitled Race Around Oz, was restricted to the Australian continent because it was the Olympic year and the producers wished to focus on Australia.

A youth-oriented program titled Race Around the Corner was produced by ABC Children's Unit with students (14–16 years of age) making low-budget local productions in the same style as Race Around the World.

Host Richard Fidler undertook a few more television hosting gigs, including the short-lived ABC art and culture chat program Vulture. He then became a radio presenter and host of the popular Conversations radio show and podcast.

Most of the racers from the series went on to pursue careers in media and film-making:

 Perhaps the biggest success story amongst the racers has been that of the controversial John Safran. Safran actually came last on the first series (won by Olivia Rousset), despite winning the popular vote. The reason for this was that Safran had been disqualified from one round after submitting a film in which he had covertly filmed priests giving confession in Rio de Janeiro. Safran went on to produce and present several television programs: John Safran's Music Jamboree and John Safran vs God for SBS; and John Safran's Race Relations for the ABC.
 Olivia Rousset, Bentley Dean and Kim Traill have worked as reporters for the SBS program Dateline. Traill's book Red Square Blues: A Beginner's Guide to the Decline and Fall of the Soviet Union was published by HarperCollins in September 2009.
 Catherine Turner was a reporter with Al Jazeera, and later Channel 7.
 Bentley Dean was nominated for an Academy Award for Tanna.
 Scott Herford has produced three Australian independent feature films. 
 Like John Safran, Tony Wilson went on to host the breakfast show on Melbourne radio station 3RRR, and has written a novel called Players.
 Ben Davies is the creator and producer of the Network Ten observational documentary series Bondi Rescue.

See also
 Le Grand Raid Le Cap Terre de Feu
 Race Across the World

References

External links
 Race Around the World website (ABC TV) – archived on the Internet Archive
 
 Race Around the World on Screen Australia

Australian Broadcasting Corporation original programming
1997 Australian television series debuts
1998 Australian television series endings
1990s Australian documentary television series
Australian travel television series
1990s Australian reality television series